The Barr Tribunal was a Public Inquiry in Ireland established by Resolutions passed by the Dáil Éireann and the Seanad Éireann on 17 and 18 April 2002, and by Instrument entitled Tribunals of Inquiry Evidence Acts 1921 (Establishment of Tribunal) Instrument (No. 2) 2002 made by the Minister for Justice, Equality and Law Reform on 1 July 2002.

The sole member of the Tribunal was Justice Robert Barr. The Tribunal was charged with investigating the facts and circumstances surrounding the fatal shooting of John Carthy (by members of the Garda Síochána) at Abbeylara, County Longford on 20 April 2000.

Chapters 1-2: Introduction & Background
John Carthy, a then 27-year-old native of Toneymore, Abbeylara, Co Longford, on 19 April 2000, went to the cabinet within which was his shotgun.

He brought it, a full box of cartridges and his gun belt back to the kitchen remonstrating, according to his mother, that "no one was going to put him out of his house". He loaded the gun with two cartridges, went outside the hall door and discharged two shots. It is not quite clear whether John then forced his mother out of the family home, or whether she left at her own volition. However, Rose Carthy left the family home and went to her sister's home, two doors away. Mrs Carthy informed the Barr Tribunal that her son did not order her out of the home, despite rumours to the contrary at the time and news reports. She was, however, very afraid for her son.

Rose Carthy asked her sister, Nancy Walsh, to ring the Gardaí in Granard, three kilometres away, to come out and "take the gun from John".
Two Gardaí, John Gibbons and Colin White, were dispatched to the scene.  Garda Gibbons was armed.  
At approximately 17:55 on Wednesday 19 April 2000 the two Gardaí drove into the driveway of the Carthy home. Two shots were fired in rapid succession from an unknown place and in an unknown direction. They quickly reversed their car and observed the Carthy home from a safer distance. At this stage John Carthy's general practitioner, Dr. Patrick Cullen, was called to the scene. While waiting for Gardaí he said that approximately ten shots were fired "out the back of the house".
Detective Garda Campbell attempted to talk with John Carthy but, in his evidence, said Carthy replied with an expletive and a threat to blow his head off.

A decision was taken to deploy a party of armed local Garda around the house pending the arrival of the elite Emergency Response Unit from Dublin.
The ERU team arrived with a trained negotiator: Sergeant Micheal Jackson.
Among their weapons were Uzi sub-machine guns, a Heckler & Koch assault rifle, a Benelli combat shotgun and Sig Sauer semi-automatic pistols.

A two-day siege thus began.  Numerous attempts to negotiate with Carthy via a loudhailer, mobile phone and landline were repeatedly responded to with expletives and the firing of shots, sometimes directly at the negotiation post itself.
Various tactics were employed by the negotiator including talking to his friends, offers to talk to his sister etc.  Attempts were made to find out what the source of Johns difficulty was, what, if any, his demands were etc.
Various attempts to open a dialogue were rebuffed.

John made somewhat confusing and poorly worded demands for cigarettes and a solicitor.  
To the former, the negotiator saw this as a way of opening a dialogue so he told him all they needed to do was ensure a safe method of delivery.  In this Sergeant Jackson was technically breaking the negotiators rule 'no concession without one in exchange' but felt it worth it as it might calm him and build some trust.
He repeatedly told John that someone could approach to leave them nearby if he put the gun on the table (beside which he was looking out the window towards the negotiation post as he was talking to Jackson) and kept his hands in view.  John replied with various rebuffs including 'don't bother, don't bother'.
As to the solicitor he was told they could not send one in while he still had the gun, as this appeared to be what John wanted.  However they could get one on the phone to advise him if he could tell them whom to get in touch with.
Jackson feared that having someone encroach on the home while Carthy was resting, to drop cigarettes covertly, might cause Carthy irritation at the invasion of his security.
Carthy was quite vague on the identity of the solicitor and the scene commander thought it a waste of time to get one from the locality.  
At 12.24 pm, John Carthy telephoned a friend, Kevin Ireland, he informed him he hadn't a notion of hurting anyone, that he was simply keeping them at bay with the gun, and that he wanted a solicitor, one by the name of "Mick Finucane". 
Kevin Ireland was not properly debriefed on this conversation by Garda officers and this critical information did not reach the negotiator.  
Carthy was confused about the identity of who he wanted.  It is likely, that he was alluding to Michael Finucane, the Belfast solicitor and son of the assassinated Pat Finucane.

At approximately 5:55 p.m. on day two of the siege, Carthy exited the house.  There were yells of armed Gardi drop your gun and various words to that effect.  Jackson asked Carthy in a more direct and pleading tone, noted in its distinct nature by witnesses, to drop the weapon.  Jackson reluctantly drew his Sig Saur pistol and attempted to bring Carthy down without killing him, with two shots to his legs.  These shots did not bring him down and he appeared not to notice them.
In these crucial seconds, which the Tribunal found to be around a minute's duration, the ERU team was hesitating on opening fire, continuing to plead with John Carthy to surrender.  The hesitation was so complete that local armed officers in the outer perimeter began to think the ERU team would not fire and one remarked we're gonna have to do it ourselves and was within a second of opening fire when Garda McCabe took action.
Garda McCabe fired his Uzi at Carthy once, then again, both in the torso.  On the fourth shot, Carthy collapsed onto his side.

The ERU team moved in to disarm him and turning him onto his back saw he was critically injured.  Medical help was summoned and they began immediate CPR.  Despite various attempts to revive him, Carthy died quickly.

His sister, Maire Carthy, held a press conference calling for a public inquiry.
A Garda investigation found no wrongdoing by the ERU team.  A later FBI report concluded that the ERU team hesitated too long in allowing Carthy to cross the inner perimeter.
An Oireachtas inquiry was undertaken but shut down by the Supreme Court.

Chapters 3/8: John Carthy's Background
John Carthy was born on 9 October 1972

John had suffered from Bipolar disorder from around the time of his father's death in 1990, but had controlled his illness well.
He had a deep connection to his father and grandfather, was employed locally and had several friends in the locality.  
From 1992 John Carthy possessed a licence for a shotgun which he used to shoot game with friends. It was a Russian-made 12 bore, double-barreled weapon, maintained in good condition.

John Carthy's other sporting activity was handball for which he had a substantial reputation. In 1997/8 he was involved in rebuilding the handball court in Abbeylara which had become dilapidated and unfit for use. It appears that a problem emerged after its rehabilitation in that the court was frequently occupied by children and John Carthy had difficulty in finding a convenient slot in which to play. This upset him and appears to have caused him significant annoyance.

The two senior psychiatrists, Dr. McGeown and Dr. Shanley, who treated him on numerous occasions and at some length for mental illness described their patient as being in the words of Dr. McGeown ‘‘a sensitive, diffident young man, probably relatively easily upset by any kind of physical or emotional trauma’’.  His sister described him as "intelligent, popular, hardworking, witty, gentle and a man who never let anyone down".

Dr. Shanley never witnessed John Carthy being aggressive. In his opinion he did not have an aggressive personality. (‘‘He was a quiet, very sensitive sort of person’’). Dr. Bluett, John Carthy's general practitioner in Galway, assessed his patient as being ‘‘quiet and affable’’. However, exacerbation's of his bipolar disorder from time to time whether depressive, hypo-manic or manic brought about substantial deterioration in his personality and on occasions led to delusions.

The tribunal found that in the period running up to the Siege however, a series of crises combined to worsen John's depression and were likely contributory factors to his behavior on the day of the siege:

Loss of employment and a difficult claim of unfair dismissal.
Death of his father and grandfather, both of whom he had been very close to.  His psychiatrist concluded that his illness prevented him from adequately grieving in the normal way and getting past their deaths, leaving him affected by them for years after.
The coming demolition of the family home by the county council, a home with which he had associated happier memories with his father and grandfather.  This home was to be replaced by a new one that was almost ready when the siege took place.
A breakup with his girlfriend which, ironically being a result of his worsening depression causing his behavior to trigger her breaking up with him, further served to worsen his illness.
It is useful to examine a letter John Carthy sent to the ex-girlfriend after their breakup.  The tribunal found that it showed he had what psychiatrists refer to as 'insight' (Awareness of his illness and some conscious control over it) and was aware that his recent life experiences had forced a major downturn in his depression: "The way I have been acting in the last few weeks has put a lot of strain both on you and those closest to me. Marie in particular has been very upset and my friendship with ‘‘Pepper’’ has been put under strain. To them I owe a lot. But it is you [X], I have hurt most and it is this that upsets me most.
I do not wish to use this problem as an excuse for my behavior but it is this that has made me so impatient and argumentative and so overbearing over the last while. I admire you for your honesty and you should always be in the future as trust is always best, in the long run.  I am sure we would be still together were it not for me being elated and my mood swings."(The full letter is contained in Chapter 8 of the Barr Tribunal Report)

His gun being taken from him as a result of subterfuge by a Garda officer who was acting on third hand and uncorroborated information, later proven definitively false, that he had threatened to fire the weapon on children who were in a handball alley he wanted to use, one that he had been instrumental in restoring from a dilapidated state previously.
The Tribunal, while understanding that Garda officers might occasionally have to resort to subterfuge to obtain a gun from someone as a less unethical alternative to using force to take it from them, decided that the fact that this was done based on unsubstantiated information that was not properly investigated was unacceptable misconduct by the Garda in question.

An incident of false arrest by a local Garda and assault while in custody under this false arrest.
A local GAA teams mascot, in the form of a mock-goat on top of a car transporter decked in the team's colors, had been gutted by a fire not long before the siege.
A Garda at Johns local station was phoned by another Garda in another district, who provided a lead on this crime.  His 'lead', barely deserved to be called that.  There were no named witnesses, there was no formal complaint, there was no formal description of the crime or specifics whatsoever, just vague accusations that he was the 'one who did it'.
Garda Turlough Bruen of Granard Garda station arrested John Carthy and, the tribunal was satisfied, along with Garda McHugh, subjected him to a lengthy interrogation, during which he was physically assaulted in an attempt to coerce him into a confession.
Carthys gun had been taken from him, as outlined above, just before this and when told he had to report to the station he assumed it was to discuss its return.
The actions of Garda Turlough and Garda McHugh are even more outrageous, the tribunal found, given that Carthy was aware that the source of this false allegation was a former employer he was having a dispute with and Carty had already made the Garda station in question aware of the slanderous accusations and their lack of basis in fact.

These two false accusations and misconduct by police, the tribunal found, poisoned the relationship between Carthy and the police forever, and had this misconduct not taken place, the negotiator at the siege might have found it easier to build a rapport and dialogue with Carthy.  But with the experience of having twice been the subject of police misconduct as retaliation for things he had not even done, there was no possibility of him ever trusting the police again.

Psychiatric evidence presented to the tribunal indicated that. through the lens of his worsening depression, he viewed these events as his life becoming progressively worse and the home was the last positive thing left he had to defend.  This combined with his negative view of the police as a result of his false arrest, accounted for his hostility to Garda officers at the scene.

Chapters 4-7: The Siege and uncontrolled exit
The tribunal contained the following findings in relation to the management of the siege and the uncontrolled exit:
 The deployment of the ERU was in line with international best practice, and they were far more capable of dealing with the event than local officers.  Indeed, the tribunal thought that ERU teams should have full scene command in future due to the anomaly of an ERU team commander having to answer to a Superintendent who may be of higher rank but be less experienced and not as highly trained in siege management.
 It exonerated the ERU team of any legal culpability for John Carthy's death and concluded that they acted lawfully in genuine fear for safety of those in the area in the discharge of their firearms on the day. The tribunal concluded that as far as the negotiator and ERU team knew, Carthy was a clear and present danger to everyone around him. Indeed, the Tribunal noted that one of the two officers to fire on Carthy, Sergeant Jackson, broke with Garda rules of engagement and international practice by not shooting at Carthy's torso ('centre mass') as all police are trained to in order to hit the central nervous system to incapacitate the threat quickly. In evidence Sergeant Jackson said he made this decision in a desperate attempt to neutralize John Carthy as a threat without killing him. However, two shots to the legs did not halt him, so a further shot to the torso was fired, which also did not stop him, and thus a final fourth shot was fired.
 Despite exonerating the ERU team itself the Tribunal found critical failures by the higher ranking Garda in charge of the siege. The Tribunal found that due to Garda command incompetence, critical information that should have reached the Garda negotiator, Carthy's call to his friend Kevin Ireland, which might have allowed the siege to end more peacefully, was not passed on. The tribunal further found that the scene commander failed to properly plan for an uncontrolled (armed) exit by John Carthy and that some of the instructions given to local and ERU officers were 'vague'. It was found that the scene commander failed to properly consult with mental health professionals and that he assumed that when Carthy could not name a specific solicitor that getting one anyway would be a 'waste of time'. The tribunal was of the view this avenue should have been explored anyway via the family solicitor or one John had used himself in the past. The Tribunal concluded that in future an ERU team leader of higher rank should be in charge in future such situations, regardless of the rank of others in the area as they were the most experienced and skilled to make these decisions. Scene commanders failure to properly consult psychological professionals was criticized.
 He thought that Sergeant Jackson was overworked and should have had more backup and resources at his disposal.  International experts said he had the 'bare minimum' with only one assistant and not officer dedicated to collection for him of intelligence on the subject, his family, his background etc. which are all critical in opening a dialogue in these situations.  Without an Intel officer, Jackson was forced to try to probe Carthy himself for the source of his problems and, being that Carthy was in a manic depressive state, he was hardly in the right frame of mind to give him accurate information or to respond coherently.
 In the opinion of experts one of the few errors Jackson made was to fail to read Carthy's body language and press home the advantage when he was persuading him to go down the road of surrendering peacefully.  There was a moment during their talks when John put the gun down, putting his head in his hands rubbing the sides of his head, his voice breaking saying quietly I don't know... Jackson failed to see this as a 'buy sign', a sign of serious consideration, that his argument was working.
 Mr. Justice Barr also said it was "patently negligent not to contact the subject's own attorney or ... the family solicitor".  He said the scene commanders decision that it would be a waste of time to engage a solicitor locally or a family solicitor when other intermediary's had not worked, was a major failure in reasoning.
 It was found that the scene commanders cordon deployment was set up to create disaster and had matters gone differently, could have ended in friendly fire deaths among Garda officers.  There was an inner cordon of ERU officers, and an outer cordon of armed local officers as backups.  The tribunal and experts employed by it said these local officers should have been either dismissed or sent to one of the local houses in a secondary role, as if Carthy had left the inner cordon and ERU and local armed Garda officers had both fired on him, there may have been a 'blue on blue' shooting.
 Failure by the scene commander to appoint a family liaison officer of sufficient experience was cited.  The officer appointed was a newly sworn member with no experience mere weeks into the job, and while the tribunal stated that the officer in question did her best under difficult circumstances, she should have been replaced by someone more experienced.  Experts employed by the tribunal stated that in the US and other states it's not uncommon for the family liaison officer to even move in with the family for the duration of the siege to build a rapport, talk to them and build information for the Intel officer (who in this siege did not exist) that may help the negotiator build a rapport and empathize with the subject.
 The central scene commander error was to not properly prepare for an uncontrolled, armed exit by Carthy.  Instructions on what to do in various scenarios were vague and contradictory.
 Failure to use Carthy's GP and psychiatrist as fountains of information, knowledge and Intel was substantial.
 The tribunal found that Sergeant Jackson's call not to deliver the requested cigarettes to Carthy covertly, with the concern that it might be seen by him as a breach of trust, was not the right call.  While he accepted that he could examine the situation in retrospect and Jackson only had the reality on the day to deal with, it was thought by Justice Barr, and the experts questioned, that any encroachment to help him rather than hurt him might have been seen in a positive light.  That the nicotine might have calmed him somewhat was also considered.
 Choosing to negotiate by loudhailer and by direct voice to voice, which required shouting in some instances, was criticized by the experts consulted by the tribunal.  They insisted that in order to build a rapport, talking on a private phone line is far easier, where subtle issues like tone of voice, conveying empathy etc. are of central importance.  In addition, when discussing intimate issues that are central to the subjects complaints, like their mental health and love life, those issues are best kept off a loud megaphone or by shouting them over a few meters distance.
 The location of the command post was criticized by the tribunal and experts.  While the experts noted Sergeant Jackson's passionate defense of the site as an attempt to be physically closer to Carthy to build a rapport more easily resulted in them 'almost being convinced' they still felt the site was far too dangerous, especially in light of the fact that Carthy had repeatedly fired his shotgun at the wall where the post was located and seemed amused that he had forced the negotiator to duck.
 Uniformed and non uniformed Garda officers loitering between the inner and outer cordon and just outside the outer cordon was criticized.  The tribunal and its experts found officers without a specific task should have been dismissed from the scene or at the very least kept in reserve in the nearby neighbors house.
Indeed, the experts noted that the entire point of having a national specialist firearms unit like the ERU, is to allow them to take over local armed situations to release the local police to return to their regular duties.  There seemed to be many hanging around to see what happens and this not only was bad practice on its own but made those individuals potential targets when Carthy came out causing them to run for cover upon his exit.  Indeed, the scene commander recalled yelling at them to get back and get under cover when Carthy emerged.

 The Tribunal was satisfied that there were only four shots fired.  All the evidence backed this up and there was none to the contrary found.  However the tribunal was critical of the investigators taking the word of the local Garda officers that they did not discharge their weapons.  The Garda team brought in to investigate the outcome of the siege had taken the ERU teams weapons for ballistics testing but did not do so with the locals guns.  The tribunal did not believe this to be evidence of a coverup but found it sloppy investigation practice and concluded it should have been done for the sake of thoroughness.
 The tribunal found four crucial command mistakes:
 Superintendent Shelly's negligence in not personally interviewing Dr. Cullen (the subject's general medical practitioner) as a matter of urgency during the evening of 19th April or, alternatively, having him interviewed in depth at that time by an experienced senior officer, is extraordinary.
 It is pertinent to state also that Superintendent Shelly appears to have done very little, if anything, in his adopted role of intelligence co-coordinator.
 It ought to have been apparent to all concerned that Mr. Carthy's particular agitation and violent conduct within the house during the late afternoon of 20th April probably indicated that he regarded himself as being near the end of his tether at that time. Bearing that in mind, the possibility that he might leave the house armed with his gun became a more likely reality. That being so, the importance of clearing the road to Abbeylara of vehicles, including the command jeep, and all personnel, not only police but civilians also, ought to have been apparent to the scene commander and to the ERU tactical commander. ... The greatest Garda mistake at Abbeylara was not preparing for an uncontrolled exit by Mr. Carthy from his house
 Failure to provide a solicitor for John Carthy at the scene as requested by him

Chapters 9: The Conduct of the Media
In addition to the above findings the Barr Tribunal was particularly critical of the Irish media. This is worthy of note, despite the fact that the media organizations concerned did not accentuate this aspect of the report.

Judge Barr found the RTÉ's Five Seven Live radio show was particularly irresponsible in naming John Carthy and Barr adjudged that "the facts and circumstances surrounding the fatal shooting of John Carthy as specified in the Tribunal's Terms of Reference include matters which add[ed] to or could have potential for aggravating the deceased's apparently serious mental distress which became progressively more severe as the episode at Abbeylara continued (vide the evidence of Dr. John Sheehan and other psychiatrists given at the Tribunal), and in consequence the potential for undermining the possibility of successful dialogue between the Garda negotiator and John Carthy which might have avoided the circumstances that gave rise to his death."[12] In addition to RTÉ, the Sunday Independent was also strongly criticised, particularly an article entitled Dramatic New Evidence in Abbeylara Case with beneath it a subsidiary headline "Abbeylara family row over land may have affected siege victim Carthy's state of mind prior to his death".

That article was published on 31 October 2004 and Justice Barr found it to be full of factual errors.  He speculated it was the result of attempts to discredit his sister by Garda officers as it was her contention that she could have served as a better intermediary than those tried and was prevented from going to the negotiation point.  The Tribunal noted that the Carthy family had sued that particular newspaper for the article in question, and that the Sunday Independent had settled out of court before the trial.

Chapters 10-12: Garda Conduct in the context of International Best Practice
The tribunal found that Garda conduct in relation to the organization and operation of the ERU was within international norms.  However, there were several critical deficiencies:

 A limited availability of less lethal weapons.
 Total unavailability of attack dog units
 Failure to appoint an intelligence officer
 Failure to appoint an appropriate family liaison officer.

Chapters 13: Gun Law in Ireland
The Tribunal found Irish firearms laws fragmented and poorly focused.
A summary of Irish firearms law was given:

 Lawfully held firearms are permitted by the state upon the person being furnished with a firearms cert from an area Garda Superintendent.
Before granting a firearm certificate to any person under this Act the superintendent of the Garda Sıochana or the Minister (as the case may require) shall be satisfied that such a person —

(a)        has a good reason for requiring the firearm in respect of which the certificate is applied for, and

(b)        can be permitted to have in his possession, use and carry a firearm without danger to the public safety or to the peace, and

(c)         is not a person declared by this Act to be disentitled to hold a firearms certificate.  They include, inter alia, any person of intemperate habits, any person of unsound mind and any person who is subject to the supervision of the police. A person of ‘‘unsound mind’’ is not defined in the firearms legislation. However, it is referred to (rather than defined) in the Mental Treatment Act, 1945 as a person who requires detention for protection and care and who is unlikely to recover within a six-month period. The Mental Health Act, 2001 does not utilise the term ‘‘unsound mind’’.
 Section 5 of the 1925 Act provides that the superintendent of the Garda Sı´ocha´na of the district in which the holder of a firearm certificate resides may revoke the certificate at any time if he/she is satisfied that the holder:

(a)          has no good reason for requiring the firearm to which the certificate relates, or

(b)          is a person who cannot, without danger to the public safety or the peace be permitted to have a firearm in his possession, or

(c)           is a person who is declared by this Act to be disentitled to hold a firearm certificate, or

(d)          where the firearm certificate limits the purpose for which the firearm to which it relates may be used, is using such firearm for purposes not authorized by the certificate.

 Firearms certs must be renewed regularly.
 Section 23 of the 1925 Act provides that a court may order the forfeiture of firearms or cancel a firearm certificate in circumstances where a person is convicted of an offence under the Act, is convicted of any crime for which he or she is sentenced to penal servitude or imprisonment, is ordered to be the subject of police supervision, or is ordered to enter into a recognisance to keep the peace or to be of good behavior
 Under section 4 of the 1964 Act the Minister may, on the grounds of public safety, or public security (see also Regulation 12 of S.I. 362/93) make an order requiring every person in a specified area to surrender a particular class of firearm or ammunition to the Garda Sıochana. On foot of such an order the police may seize any firearm to which the order relates and retain it in their possession. The Garda Sıochana has no other statutory right to confiscate licensed firearms pending revocation of the relevant certificate.
 The Tribunal found: There are no guidelines in this jurisdiction for the assistance of issuing superintendents on the exercise of their discretion under the firearms legislation. The absence of guidelines militates against consistency and uniformity in the processing and granting of gun licenses and renewals thereof.
 The Tribunal found: There is no provision in the application form for a firearm certificate for furnishing any information regarding the applicant's mental or physical fitness.
 The Tribunal found: In the interest of avoiding inconsistency in rulings on licensing applications I recommend that appropriate formal guidelines should be devised for the benefit of superintendents who have responsibility for issuing new gun licences and renewals thereof
 Firearms can only be used for sporting purposes for shooting game, and firing at inanimate targets in gun clubs, there is no provision in Irish law that allows a firearm to be used for self-defense, legal or otherwise.

Chapters 14: Consideration of 'Suicide by Cop' Scenario
The tribunal asked international experts in policing and psychological experts to examine the Abbylara scenario for evidence of suicide by cop.
While some of the police experts suspected it, the majority of the psychological experts with experience and expertise in this area said it was probably not the case.  Carthys bipolar disorder was in the manic or 'elated' stage where one is pumped up rather than depressed, as evidenced by him pacing around the house, engaging in bravado and banging his shotgun on the table beside the window he used to talk to the negotiator.  
However, because he had several times yelled shoot me or come in and get me the tribunal found that suicide by cop had to be explored.

The tribunal was satisfied that this was not the case, noting that he passed several ERU members he could have provoked into shooting him, and indeed one of them was standing in full view on the boundary wall between the two houses, it seemed logical that leveling the rifle at him would have resulted in a hail of fire in his direction quickly, but he did not do this.

The tribunal considered what Carthy was thinking upon exiting the house.  While some of it is by nature guesswork a theory can be formulated based on his background, statements and previous actions.  Mr Justice Barr concluded he may have intended to surrender his gun to his family rather than the police.
He acknowledged the ERU team had no way of knowing this and could not have just let him walk off with his gun as he might have posed a danger to the public.

Chapters 15: Recommendations
 An urgent review of Garda command structures for dealing with sieges to place the ERU or other such team commander in charge of the scene, regardless of presence of a higher-ranking officer.
 More expertise and training in dealing with people with mental illnesses was long overdue, especially when the ERU was involved and a formal relationship with the state psychologists established.
 The ERU  should henceforth be equipped with less-lethal options including an attack dog unit.
 More comprehensive siege training needs to be undertaken with the desirability of devising and adopting a retraining model based on that in Victoria, Australia — Project Beacon. The Tribunal is aware that it has had exceptional success and has been highly acclaimed in other jurisdictions.
 Intel officers and family liaison offers should be appointed in all such situations in future.

Publication and reaction
The Tribunal reported its findings on 20 July 2006 in a 740-page report following four years of investigations at a cost of €18 million.

The Garda Commissioner, saying Barr had four years, the officers on the ground had mere seconds, was reluctant to apologize to the family.  He eventually did, as did the government, for their failure to have appropriate structures and practices in place to manage the siege more effectively.

The Garda armed service units have since been radically reorganized, while the ERU remains they are supplemented by skilled regional support units that are trained to nearly the same level.
Several interventions of both the ERU and RSU teams have taken place since the Carthy siege and due to implementation of the Barr Tribunal reforms, only one of them has resulted in loss of life by civilian or police alike.

See also
List of notable Public Inquiries in Ireland
Tribunal
Public Inquiry
The Mahon Tribunal
McCracken Tribunal
Kerry Babies Tribunal

References

External links
Barr Tribunal
RTE coverage of Barr Tribunal's conclusions

Law enforcement in the Republic of Ireland
Politics of the Republic of Ireland
2002 in Ireland
2006 in Ireland
Public inquiries in Ireland
2002 in Irish law
2006 in Irish law
2002 in Irish politics
2006 in Irish politics